Michal Martikán (born 18 May 1979) is a Slovak slalom canoeist who has been competing at the international level since 1994. In 1996 he became the first athlete to win an Olympic gold medal for Slovakia since the country gained independence in 1993. In total he won 5 Olympic medals (2 golds, 2 silvers and 1 bronze), which is the most among all slalom paddlers. He has also won the World Championship title in the C1 individual category four times.

Career
At the age of 16, Michal Martikán became the youngest winner of a World Cup slalom canoeing event. Three months later, at age 17, Martikán was in sixth place after the first run of the canoe slalom singles event at the 1996 Olympics. With nothing to lose, he went all out on the second run and just bettered the score of defending champion Lukáš Pollert of the Czech Republic. Martikán was the first Olympic champion to represent independent Slovakia. He entered the 2000 Olympics as the favourite, having consistently finished near the top in every major competition and in each World Cup series. At the Sydney Games, Martikán registered the best score in the qualifying round, but was only in fifth place after the first run of the final. In the second run, he paddled a perfect course and his time was the fastest of the round. He was able to move up to the silver medal position behind Tony Estanguet of France. Competing in his third Olympics in 2004, Martikán again led the qualifying round. He also earned the highest score in the semi-finals, which also served as the first run of the final. After the second run, it appeared that Martikán had regained the Olympic title, but the referees controversially decided to award him a two-second penalty which pushed him to second place, only 12 hundredths of a second behind Estanguet. Martikán regained the Olympic title at the 2008 games in Beijing. At the 2012 Summer Olympics in London Martikán took bronze. Michal Martikán is the only slalom canoeist to win five Olympic medals, one in each of the five games from 1996 through 2012.

At the World Championships, Martikán had an uninterrupted medal run in the individual C1 event between 1995 and 2010. The 2011 ICF Canoe Slalom World Championships saw him finish outside the medals for the first time in an Olympic or World Championship individual race in his career. Ironically, this failure came in front of a home crowd on the Čunovo course near Bratislava. However, he managed to win gold in the team event with his Slovak teammates to prolong his medal run. He won another six gold medals in the C1 team event between 2013 and 2019, making it 17 straight World Championships with a medal.

He won his first medals in 1995 when he was just 16. He took a bronze in the C1 event and another bronze in the C1 team event. In 1997 he won his first individual world title as well as team gold. He won the individual C1 event on three more occasions (2002, 2003 and 2007). As of 2019 he has a total of 23 World Championship medals (15 golds, 3 silvers and 5 bronzes) which is more than any other slalom paddler in any category.

He has also won the overall World Cup title five times (1998, 2000, 2001, 2006, 2014), which is a record among C1 paddlers.

At the European Championships he has won four straight individual golds between 2007 and 2010. Slovakia won the C1 team event 11 times with him in the team. He also has 6 silvers (4 individual and 2 in team event) and 2 bronzes (1 individual and 1 in the team event).

Martikán is coached by his father Jozef.

World Cup individual podiums

1 World Championship counting for World Cup points
2 European Championship counting for World Cup points
3 Oceania Championship counting for World Cup points

Awards
Slovak Sportsperson of the Year: 1996, 1997, 2007, 2008
Inducted into the Whitewater Hall of Fame: 2010.

Manslaughter conviction
In November 1997 Martikán was involved in a car accident near the village of Velké Zálužie, Slovakia. The car he was driving hit a pedestrian causing him fatal injuries. The investigation concluded that Martikán was traveling substantially over the 40 km/h speed limit. It was also found that the killed man was highly intoxicated at the time of the accident, in dark outside the inhabited area.

With Martikán facing actual incarceration due to the violation of his probation terms (during his Australia's training camp he should process the license returning, a day after returning home while picking up the letter from the post office about driving license returning, the police surprisingly wait for him outside the building and he got in troubles...), then-president Rudolf Schuster, amid grave criticism, granted Martikán a presidential pardon, which besides sparing him from jail time effectively meant removal of the conviction from his criminal record. Schuster argued that Martikán's positive athletic representation of the country abroad warranted the pardon, while critics pointed to the double standard and the preferential treatment Martikán was receiving as a sport celebrity.

See also
List of multiple Olympic medalists in one event
List of multiple Summer Olympic medalists

References

External links
 
 
 
 
 
 
 
 
 
 

1979 births
Canoeists at the 1996 Summer Olympics
Canoeists at the 2000 Summer Olympics
Canoeists at the 2004 Summer Olympics
Canoeists at the 2008 Summer Olympics
Canoeists at the 2012 Summer Olympics
Living people
Olympic canoeists of Slovakia
Olympic gold medalists for Slovakia
Olympic silver medalists for Slovakia
Slovak male canoeists
Sportspeople from Liptovský Mikuláš
Olympic medalists in canoeing
Olympic bronze medalists for Slovakia
Medalists at the 2012 Summer Olympics
Medalists at the 2008 Summer Olympics
International whitewater paddlers
Medalists at the 2004 Summer Olympics
Medalists at the 2000 Summer Olympics
Medalists at the 1996 Summer Olympics
Medalists at the ICF Canoe Slalom World Championships